Bačkovík (1323 Bagak, 1427 Nagybagyok, Nagybadoch, 1430 Nogh Bagh, Kysbagh) is a village and municipality in Košice-okolie District in the Košice Region of Slovakia.

History
Historically, the village was first mentioned in 1329as Sztancsóy (Stančov) feudatories’ property. After, in the order, it belonged to Perényi (1427), Zombory  (18th century), Desseffwy and Bocskay noble families.

Geography
It has a population of about 400 people.

Genealogical resources

The records for genealogical research are available at the state archive "Statny Archiv in Kosice, Slovakia"

 Roman Catholic church records (births/marriages/deaths): 1755-1895
 Greek Catholic church records (births/marriages/deaths): 1788-1906
 Lutheran church records (births/marriages/deaths): 1775-1895
 Census records 1869 of Backovik are available at the state archive.

See also
 List of municipalities and towns in Slovakia

External links

Villages and municipalities in Košice-okolie District